The Berkeley Pier is in Berkeley, California. When constructed in 1926, the pier extended  into San Francisco Bay from the end of University Avenue. Due to extensive filling of the bay and the creation of the Berkeley Marina, it presently extends only . Since 1937, only the first  were maintained and open to the public until July 2015, when public access was closed due to safety concerns.

History

In the mid-19th century, two private wharves were built along the Berkeley waterfront. One was located at the foot of Addison Street one block south of University Avenue and served the Standard Soap Company, a major regional soap-making factory. The other, the Jacobs and Heywood Wharf, was located several blocks north of University Avenue at the foot of Delaware Street, used as a general freight transshipment point.

In 1909, the City built a municipal wharf at the foot of University Avenue.  This pier was intended for a commuter ferry which never materialized, and the pier was instead used mainly for freight.

In 1925, the Golden Gate Ferry Company announced its plans to build a new ferry pier for its proposed automobile ferry service between Berkeley and San Francisco.  The City of Berkeley agreed to a 50-year lease of the tidelands off the Berkeley waterfront for the construction of a new ferry pier.

On January 25, 1926, the Golden Gate Ferry Company applied to the California State Railroad Commission (predecessor of the California Public Utilities Commission) for a certificate permitting it operate a ferry service between Berkeley and San Francisco.

On July 7, 1926, the Golden Gate Ferry Company applied to the California State Railroad Commission for a certificate permitting it operate vessels on San Francisco Bay between Berkeley and San Francisco.  The permit was granted.

In 1926, the Golden Gate Ferry Company began construction of the Berkeley Pier. It was built out from the foot of University Avenue, extending about  into the Bay (measured from the original shoreline).  The length was determined by the distance to deeper water.  Nearly the entire length of the pier was paved as a two-lane road.  At its end, the pier widened to accommodate vehicles waiting for a ferry.  Two ferry docks were constructed.

On June 16, 1927, auto ferry service began between the Berkeley Pier and  the Hyde Street Pier in San Francisco, a pier shared with the Sausalito ferry.

In December 1928, the Golden Gate Ferry Company and the competing auto ferry system of the Southern Pacific railroad decided to merge.  They petitioned for the approval of the Railroad Commission.  With the approval in hand, the new Southern Pacific-Golden Gate Ferries Ltd. was incorporated on February 18, 1929.  On May 1, 1929, ferry service to San Francisco from the Berkeley Pier was taken over by the new company.

At the beginning of service, before the merger with SP, four specially-built diesel ferry boats ran every 15 minutes between Berkeley and San Francisco via the pier: The Golden Bear, the Golden Poppy, the Golden State, and the Golden Dawn, all painted yellow.  Upon merging with the SP, the boats were all re-painted in the standard Southern Pacific maritime white.

In August 1928, radio station KTAB, associated with the Pickwick Broadcasting Corporation, began construction of its broadcasting facilities including a large antenna tower at the pier.
 
From its opening in 1927 to 1937, the Pier served as an integral part of the Lincoln Highway (the first road across America), and then subsequently U.S. Route 40.

The ferry line shut down on October 16, 1937, 11 months after the Bay Bridge opened to auto traffic.

Upon the cessation of ferry service, the portion of the pier closest to shore was converted to recreational use, mainly fishing. The remaining portion of the pier was left to decay, and is still visible, but inaccessible due to a barrier. There is a gap of about fifty feet at the end of the current pier to allow the passage of small boats. In 2007, proposals were considered to start a new ferry service using a terminal near the pier.

In 2015, deterioration of the pier prompted its entrance to be fenced off.

See also

Ferries of San Francisco Bay

References

External links

"The New San Francisco-Berkeley Pier", San Francisco News Letter, Christmas Edition, December 1927, pp.48-49  Includes rare photos.
"Berkeley Pier", The Traveler, newsletter of the California Chapter of the Lincoln Highway Association, ed. Gary Kinst, January 2016, Vol.17, No. 1, pp.10-13.  
Photo of the ferry slips at the end of the Berkeley Pier. The Traveler, newsletter of the California Chapter of the Lincoln Highway Association, October, 2019, Vol.20, No. 4, p.17.
Photograph of the ferry Golden Poppy
Photograph of the ferry Kehloken, formerly the Golden State

Buildings and structures in Berkeley, California
Landmarks in the San Francisco Bay Area
Lincoln Highway
Piers in California
San Francisco Bay
U.S. Route 40
Tourist attractions in Berkeley, California
Transportation buildings and structures in Alameda County, California